is the railway station in Shimamachi-chō Fukae-men, Sasebo, Nagasaki Prefecture.It is operated by Matsuura Railway and is on the Nishi-Kyūshū Line.

Lines
Matsuura Railway
Nishi-Kyūshū Line

Adjacent stations

|-
|colspan=5 style="text-align:center;" |Matsuura Railway

Station layout
Emukae-Shikamachi Station has one ground level island platform serving two tracks.

Environs
National Route 204
Emukae Bus Center (Saihi Motor)
Emukae Administration Center
Emukae Post Office
Emukae Police Station
Saihi Driving School
Shikamachi Technical High School

History
1 April 1987 - Railways privatize and this station is inherited by JR Kyushu.
1 April 1988 - This station is inherited by Matsuura Railway and renamed to present name.

References
Nagasaki statistical yearbook (Nagasaki prefectural office statistics section,Japanese)

External links
Matsuura Railway (Japanese)

Railway stations in Japan opened in 1939
Railway stations in Nagasaki Prefecture